Paropsis is a genus of Chrysomelidae, commonly referred to as tortoise beetles, which includes over 70 described species. Their small size, bright colours and patterns, and roughly hemispherical shape cause them to be mistaken for beetles in the family Coccinellidae (ladybirds).
They are distributed across Australia, New Zealand and Papua New Guinea. They primarily feed on Eucalyptus but there are a few that feed on Baeckea, Kunzea and Leptospermum. Species within this genus are noted as pests. For example, Paropsis charybdis is a pest of Eucalyptus in New Zealand.

Gallery

Species

 Paropsis aciculata Chapuis, 1877
 Paropsis advena Blackburn, 1894
 Paropsis aegrota Boisduval, 1835
 Paropsis affinis Blackburn, 1894
 Paropsis angusticollis Blackburn, 1894
 Paropsis aspera Chapuis, 1877
 Paropsis atomaria Olivier, 1807
 Paropsis augusta Blackburn, 1901
 Paropsis bella Blackburn, 1894
 Paropsis binbinga Daccordi, 2003
 Paropsis bivulnerata Lea, 1924
 Paropsis blandina Blackburn, 1901
 Paropsis bovilli Blackburn, 1894
 Paropsis carnosa Baly, 1866
 Paropsis cerea Blackburn, 1894
 Paropsis charybdis Stål, 1860
 Paropsis confusa Blackburn, 1890
 Paropsis convexa Blackburn, 1894
 Paropsis deboeri Selman, 1983
 Paropsis delittlei Selman, 1983
 Paropsis deserti Blackburn, 1896
 Paropsis dilatata Erichson, 1842
 Paropsis elytrura Blackburn, 1901
 Paropsis formosa Chapuis, 1877
 Paropsis geographica Baly, 1866
 Paropsis glauca Blackburn, 1894
 Paropsis hebes Weise, 1917
 Paropsis hygea Blackburn, 1901
 Paropsis inquinata Weise, 1917
 Paropsis insularis Blackburn, 1890
 Paropsis intermedia Blackburn, 1894
 Paropsis irrorata Chapuis, 1877
 Paropsis latissima Blackburn, 1894
 Paropsis latona Blackburn, 1901
 Paropsis longicornis Blackburn, 1894
 Paropsis lownei Baly, 1866
 Paropsis lutea (Marsham, 1808)
 Paropsis maculata (Marsham, 1808)
 Paropsis mandibularis Weise, 1923
 Paropsis manto Blackburn, 1901
 Paropsis marmorea Olivier, 1807
 Paropsis minor (Marsham, 1808)
 Paropsis mintha Blackburn, 1901
 Paropsis montana Blackburn, 1894
 Paropsis morbillosa Boisduval, 1835
 Paropsis mutabilis Blackburn, 1894
 Paropsis mystica Blackburn, 1894
 Paropsis obsoleta Olivier, 1807
 Paropsis omphale Blackburn, 1901
 Paropsis ornata (Marsham, 1808)
 Paropsis pantherina Fauvel, 1862
 Paropsis paphia Stål, 1860
 Paropsis parryi Baly, 1866
 Paropsis pictipennis Boheman, 1859
 Paropsis ponderosa Lea, 1924
 Paropsis porosa Erichson, 1842
 Paropsis propinqua Baly, 1866
 Paropsis quadrimaculata (Marsham, 1808)
 Paropsis roseola Baly, 1866
 Paropsis rubidipes Blackburn, 1901
 Paropsis rufitarsis Chapuis, 1877
 Paropsis rugulosa Boisduval, 1835
 Paropsis sospita Blackburn, 1901
 Paropsis tasmanica Baly, 1866
 Paropsis thyone Blackburn, 1901
 Paropsis ustulata Olivier, 1807
 Paropsis variegata Blackburn, 1894
 Paropsis variolosa (Marsham, 1808)
 Paropsis wilsoni Baly, 1866
 Paropsis yilgarnensis Blackburn, 1892
 Paropsis zietzi Blackburn, 1894

References

External links

Beetles of Australia
Chrysomelidae genera
Chrysomelinae
Taxa named by Guillaume-Antoine Olivier